Epic (stylized as epic) is a 2013 American computer-animated fantasy action-adventure film loosely based on William Joyce's 1996 children's book The Leaf Men and the Brave Good Bugs. It was produced by Blue Sky Studios; written by William Joyce, James V. Hart, Daniel Shere, Tom J. Astle and Matt Ember; and directed by Chris Wedge, the director of the animated movies Ice Age (2002) and Robots (2005). The film features the voices of Colin Farrell, Josh Hutcherson, Amanda Seyfried, Christoph Waltz, Aziz Ansari, Chris O'Dowd, Pitbull, Jason Sudeikis, Steven Tyler, and Beyoncé Knowles.

After teenager Mary Katherine gets shrunk and teleported to a tiny woodland kingdom inhabited by talking slugs, flower people and tiny soldiers called Leafmen, she is swept up in a wild adventure between good and evil and, alongside her new friends, must fight to protect the world she never knew existed.

Epic was released on May 24, 2013, by 20th Century Fox. It received mixed reviews from critics and grossed $268 million against its $93 million budget.

Plot

After her mother dies, 17-year-old Mary Katherine (“M.K.”) moves in with her eccentric scientist father Professor Bomba. Bomba has spent his life researching the Leafmen, tiny humanoid soldiers who protect the neighboring forest from wicked creatures called Boggans. M.K. is irritated by her father’s work, believing his theories to be nonsense. Meanwhile, Nod, an independent young Leafman, decides to quit, much to the ire of his no-nonsense leader Ronin, who promised Nod’s late father he would look out for him.

The forest’s benevolent ruler, Queen Tara, must choose her successor and arrives at a pool of lily pods, manned by a laid-back slug Mub and wannabe Leafman snail Grub. Immediately after she chooses a pod, the Boggans attack. The Boggans overwhelm the Leafmen, while Tara flees with Ronin on his hummingbird mount. The pair are pursued by the Boggans’ leader Mandrake and his son Dagda. Dagda is killed by Ronin, but not before he fatally wounds Tara with an arrow.

M.K. decides to leave after getting into an argument with Bomba about his research. Outside, M.K. encounters Tara, who entrusts the pod to her, shrinks her with magic, and tells her to take it to Nim Galuu, a glowworm wizard, before finally dying. M.K. is accompanied by Ronin and the Leafmen, along with Mub and Grub. Ronin recruits a reluctant Nod after saving him from short-tempered toad gangster Bufo. 

Ronin, Nod, M.K., Mub, and Grub meet Nim Galuu, who informs them that the pod must bloom that night, while exposed to the light of the full moon. When Ronin leaves, Nod takes M.K. on a deer ride and they begin to fall for each other. Meanwhile, Mandrake, grieving over his son's death, interrogates Bufo for the pod’s location. Mandrake goes to Nim Galuu's place, where he learns that if the pod blooms in darkness, it will birth a dark prince who will help Mandrake destroy the forest. He takes the pod and kidnaps Mub and Grub. Ronin scolds Nod for not being there to protect the pod. 

To get into Boggan territory undiscovered, M.K., Nod, and Ronin enter Bomba's house to get some disguises. There, M.K. learns that the Leafmen have deliberately been leading Bomba off their trail the whole time. Bomba spies them and captures M.K., but faints when he sees her. M.K. marks the location of Moonhaven on a map of the forest before rejoining Nod and Ronin. Upon reaching Boggan territory, Ronin causes a distraction while M.K. and Nod rescue Mub, Grub, and the pod. An outnumbered Ronin sacrifices himself to ensure the others escape. 

Before the full moon can open the pod at Moonhaven, Mandrake's bats block the light, causing the pod to begin blooming in darkness. While the Leafmen set out to fight the Boggans, M.K. tries to get her father’s attention by using the various cameras he had set in the forest. However, upon regaining consciousness, Bomba concludes that he has been insane all these years and begins scrapping his research. He changes his mind when he sees the red push-pin that M.K. had put on his map.

Bomba is overjoyed to see that he has been right and follows M.K. to Moonhaven. M.K. uses the bat sounds on Bomba’s iPod to lure Mandrake's bats away. Meanwhile, Mub and Nim Galuu try to stop Mandrake from reaching the pod, but are unsuccessful. Just then, Ronin reappears, having survived the attack. He is outdone by Mandrake, but Nod, who finally realizes the importance of teamwork, comes to his aid. Before Mandrake can obtain his victory, the pod fully blooms in moonlight, as Mandrake is consumed by the burl of a nearby tree.

A flower child who earlier aided in Tara’s escape is made the new queen. Grub becomes a Leafman, Nod and Ronin reconcile, and Nod and M.K. share a kiss before M.K. is returned to her original size. M.K. reunites with Bomba and later becomes his assistant; the two of them remain in contact with their small friends as they continue the research of their world.

Voice cast
Colin Farrell as Ronin, a seasoned Leafman warrior, leader of the Leafmen, Nod's guardian and teacher, and a friend of Nod's late father.
Josh Hutcherson as Nod, a rookie Leafman warrior, Ronin's student, and M.K.'s love interest and boyfriend.
Amanda Seyfried as Mary Katherine "M.K." Bomba, Professor Bomba's 17-year-old daughter. She is named after William Joyce's late daughter.
 Christoph Waltz as Mandrake, the cruel and snide owner of the Boggans. Waltz also voiced Mandrake in the German dub of the film since German is his native language.
 Aziz Ansari as Mub, a slug, Grub's best friend and caretaker of the pods.
 Chris O'Dowd as Grub, a snail, Mub's best friend and fellow caretaker of the pods.
 Pitbull as Bufo, a toad who works as a race fixer and a businessman.
 Jason Sudeikis as Professor Radcliffe Bomba, M.K.'s father and a scientist.
 Steven Tyler as Nim Galuu, a Glowworm, a showman and keeper of magic scrolls that tell what has occurred during the times, in a tree.
 Beyoncé Knowles as Queen Tara, the Mother Nature-like queen of the forest and Ronin's childhood love.
 Blake Anderson as Dagda, Mandrake's son and the Boggan's general officer. After his death, Mandrake is intent on destroying the forest.
Judah Friedlander as Larry, a taxi driver.
Thomas F. Wilson as Finn, second-in-command of the Leafmen. His name only appears in the closing credits.
John DiMaggio as Pinecone Jinn.
Rosa Salazar as Roller Derby Girl.
Kyle Kinane as Biker Dude.
Emma Kenney as Marigold Girl.

Production
In 2006, it was reported that Chris Wedge would be directing an animated feature film based on William Joyce's book, The Leaf Men and the Brave Good Bugs for Fox Animation. Joyce, who had already collaborated with Wedge as a designer and producer on the 2005 film Robots, was set to produce the film. At one point, Wedge got permission to find a new home for the film and turned to Pixar, led by John Lasseter, a close friend that Wedge knew from working on Tron. When Pixar tried to close the rights for the film and start development, Fox changed their mind, and the film returned to Fox. The film was officially greenlit in 2009, under the title Leaf Men. In May 2012, Fox announced the final title for the film (Epic) 3D-CGI its first cast details, and a plot. According to Wedge, he was not satisfied with the renaming, which was decided by the marketing department. He also expressed dissatisfaction with subtitles given to the film in some non-English countries, including the French subtitle, The Battle of the Secret Kingdom.

Although the film is based on and borrows many characters from Joyce's book, its plot has been significantly changed. Wedge explained: "[W]hile Bill wrote a wonderful book, it is a quaint story. We wanted to make a gigantic action-adventure movie." To address online speculations about whether the film is similar to other films, like FernGully: The Last Rainforest or Avatar, Wedge said: "I hate to associate it with other movies. It is adventure on the scale of Star Wars. And it does immerse the audience completely in a world like Avatar. But it has its own personality."

Release
The film was internationally released starting with May 16, 2013. In the United States, it premiered on May 18, 2013, at the Ziegfeld Theatre in New York City, and was theatrically released in on May 24, 2013.

Epic was released on DVD, Blu-ray and Blu-ray 3D on August 20, 2013. On January 29, 2021, Epic was made available to Disney+ subscribers, following  The Walt Disney Company's acquisition of both 20th Century Fox and Blue Sky Studios in 2019, but it later got removed from the service on May 1, 2021 due to pre-existing contracts.

Reception

Box office
Produced on a budget of $93 million, Epic grossed $107.5 million in North America, and $160.9 million in other countries, for a worldwide total of $268.4 million. In North America, the film earned $9.3 million on its opening day, and opened to number four in its first weekend, with $33.5 million and $42.8 million over the four day Memorial Weekend (Friday–Monday), behind Fast & Furious 6, The Hangover Part III, and Star Trek Into Darkness. In its second weekend, the film dropped to number five, grossing an additional $16.6 million. In its third weekend, the film stayed at number five, grossing $11.9 million. In its fourth weekend, the film dropped to number seven, grossing $6.3 million. While the film was overshadowed by other animated films that summer including Monsters University and Despicable Me 2, the film finished in third out of six family films that summer, and became a moderate box office success.

Critical reception
Epic received generally mixed to positive reviews from critics. The website's critical consensus reads: "Though its narrative themes are all too familiar, Epic is beautifully animated and crafted with just enough flair to make for solid family entertainment." Another review aggregation website, Metacritic, which assigns a normalized rating out of 100 top reviews from mainstream critics, calculated a score of 52 out of 100 based on 30 reviews, indicating "mixed or average reviews". Audiences polled by CinemaScore gave the film an "A" grade on an A+-to-F scale, while specifically child audiences gave it an "A+" grade.

Stephan Lee of Entertainment Weekly gave the film a B+, saying "The story lacks the specialness of a Pixar movie—it retreads the same eco-battle archetypes as FernGully and Avatar—but it's a perfectly appealing explosion of color for a lazy summer day." Michael Rechtshaffen of The Hollywood Reporter gave the film a mixed review, saying "Where the animated film comes up short is on the inspiration front—despite the intriguing terrain, its stock inhabitants lack the sort of unique personality traits that would prevent them from feeling overly familiar." Michael Phillips of the Chicago Tribune gave the film two stars, saying "It's difficult to keep its story and characters, or even its visual design, in your mind's eye, in part because the five credited screenwriters overload the narrative with incident and threatening complication." Moira Macdonald of The Seattle Times gave the film three-and-a-half stars out of four, saying "The story's simple enough to appeal to young kids (the 8-year-old with me pronounced the movie "awesome"), but adults will enjoy the beautiful animation, whether 3D or 2D." Stephen Holden of The New York Times gave the film two-and-a-half stars out of five, saying "As beautiful as it is, Epic is fatally lacking in visceral momentum and dramatic edge."

Accolades

Soundtrack

Danny Elfman, who previously worked on a William Joyce film with Meet the Robinsons, composed the original music for the film, which was released on May 21, 2013 by Sony Classics. Beyoncé performed and co-wrote with Sia an original song, titled "Rise Up." The song was released as a digital single and as part of the digital version of the soundtrack. This is the first time that a film produced by Blue Sky Studios has not been scored by John Powell since the first Ice Age installment, which was composed by David Newman.

References

External links

 
 
 
 

2013 films
2013 3D films
2013 computer-animated films
2010s American animated films
2010s children's fantasy films
2010s fantasy comedy films
20th Century Fox films
Films set in Connecticut
American action adventure films
American 3D films
American action comedy films
American children's animated adventure films
American children's animated fantasy films
American computer-animated films
American animated comedy films
Animated drama films
Animated teen films
Animated films based on children's books
Blue Sky Studios films
2010s English-language films
Films about fairies and sprites
Films about size change
20th Century Fox animated films
20th Century Fox Animation films
Films scored by Danny Elfman
Films directed by Chris Wedge
3D animated films
2013 comedy films
Films about father–daughter relationships